Bicilia lentistrialis is a moth in the family Crambidae. It was described by Paul Dognin in 1906. It is found in Paraguay.

References

Moths described in 1906
Spilomelinae